Yuhua District is one of six urban districts of the prefecture-level city of Changsha, the capital of Hunan Province, China. The district is bordered by Yuetang District of Xiangtan to the south, Changsha County to the east, Furong District to the north, Tianxin District to the west. The district has 12 subdistricts and 1 town under its jurisdiction, its jurisdiction, its administrative centre is at Guitang subdistrict.

History
Yuhua District is one of five districts established on 22 April 1996 as a result of adjusting the administrative districts of Changsha. It covers parts of the historic South District, in which Zuojiajitang, Houjiatang, Jingwanzi and Guitang four subdistricts included, parts of the historic Suburb District, in which Yuhuating Township excluding Shiren, Xinkai and Yuchang three villages, Lituo Township, Dongjing Township, Wuyi, Huoyan, Youyi and Gaoqiao four villages of Mawangdui Township.

Tiaoma Town of Changsha County was also added to Yuhua District on 14 January 2015.

Subdivisions
According to the No.1 Notice on adjustment of administrative divisions of Hunan Province in 2015 published on February 27, 2015, Yuhua has 12 subdistricts and 1 town under its jurisdiction, they are:

12 subdistricts
 Dongjing, Changsha
 Dongshan, Changsha
 Dongtang
 Gaoqiao Subdistrict, Changsha
 Guitang
 Houjiatang
 Jingwanzi
 Lituo
 Shazitang
 Tongsheng
 Yuhuating
 Zuojiatang

1 town
 Tiaoma, Changsha

Economy
According to preliminary accounting of the statistical authority, the gross domestic product of Yuhua District in 2017 was 123,087 million yuan (18,230 million US dollars), up by 8.9 percent over the previous year. Of this total, the value added of the primary industry was 574 million yuan (85 million US dollars), up by -15.6 percent, that of the secondary industry was 40,391 million yuan (5,982 million US dollars), up by 6.3 percent and that of the tertiary industry was 82,122 million yuan (12,163 million US dollars), up by 12 percent. The value added of the primary industry accounted for 0.47 percent of the GDP; that of the secondary industry accounted for 32.82 percent; and that of the tertiary industry accounted for 66.72 percent. The per capita GDP by the population of mid-year permanent residents in 2017 was about 138,611 yuan (20,529 US dollars).

References

 
Districts of Changsha